Robert C. Hartnett (born September 3, 1938) is an American politician. He served as a Democratic member for the 106th and 109th district of the Florida House of Representatives.

Life and career 
Hartnett was born in Coral Gables, Florida. He attended St. Leo's Preparatory School and the University of Miami.

In 1966, Hartnett was elected to the Florida House of Representatives. The next year, he was elected as the first representative for the newly-established 106th district. Hartnett served until 1972, when he was succeeded by Gwen Cherry. In the same year, he was elected to represent the 109th district, succeeding Jeff Gautier. He served until 1974, when he was succeeded by Joe Gersten.

References 

1938 births
Living people
People from Coral Gables, Florida
Democratic Party members of the Florida House of Representatives
20th-century American politicians
University of Miami alumni